Local elections for City of York Council were held on Thursday 3 May 2007.  The whole council was up for election. Of the 47 seats contested, the Liberal Democrats won 19 seats, Labour won 18 seats, Conservatives won eight seats and the Green Party won two seats. The election saw York's ruling Liberal Democrats lose ten seats and overall control of the council.

Election result

Ward results

Acomb ward

 * Represented the Acomb ward of York City Council, 19861996,  and the Acomb ward of City of York Council, 19952007   
 † Represented the Acomb ward of City of York Council, 19992007

Bishopthorpe ward
The parishes of Acaster Malbis and Bishopthorpe

 * Represented the Copmanthorpe ward of City of York Council, 19992003 
 † Represented the Copmanthorpe ward of City of York Council, 19992003,  and the Bishopthorpe ward of City of York Council 20032007

Clifton ward

 * Represented the Bootham ward of York City Council, 19821996,  the Fishergate division of North Yorkshire County Council, 19851989,  the Bootham ward of City of York Council, 19952003,   and the Clifton ward of City of York Council, 20032007 
 † Represented the Clifton ward of City of York Council, 20032007

Derwent ward
The parishes of Dunnington, Holtby, and Kexby

Dringhouses and Woodthorpe ward

 * Represented the Foxwood ward of York City Council, 19901996,  the Foxwood ward of City of York Council, 19952003,   and the Dringhouses and Woodthorpe ward of City of York Council, 20032007 
 † Represented the Dringhouses and Woodthorpe ward of City of York Council, 20032007

Fishergate ward

 * Represented the Fishergate ward of City of York Council, 20032007 
 † Represented the Fishergate division of North Yorkshire County Council, 19891993

Fulford ward
The parish of Fulford

 * Represented the Fulford ward of City of York Council, 20032007

Guildhall ward

 * Represented the Guildhall division of North Yorkshire County Council, 19851996,  and the Guildhall ward of City of York Council, 19952007   
 † Represented the Acomb ward of York City Council, 19791984, the Guildhall ward of York City Council, 19881996,  the Acomb division of North Yorkshire County Council, 19811989,  and the Guildhall ward of City of York Council, 19952007

Haxby and Wigginton ward
The parishes of Haxby and Wigginton

 * Represented the Haxby / Wigginton division of North Yorkshire County Council, 19931996,  the Haxby ward of City of York Council, 19952003,   and the Haxby and Wigginton ward of City of York Council, 20032007 
 † Represented the Haxby ward of City of York Council, 19992007

Heslington ward
The parish of Heslington

 * Represented the Heslington ward of City of York Council, 20032007

Heworth ward

 * Represented the Heworth ward of City of York Council, 20032007 
 † Represented the Beckfield ward of City of York Council, 19992003,  and the Heworth ward of City of York Council, 20032007

Heworth Without ward
The parish of Heworth Without

 * Represented the Monk ward of City of York Council, 20002003

Holgate ward

 * Represented the Holgate ward of City of York Council, 20032007

Hull Road ward

 * Represented the Beckfield ward of City of York Council, 19952003

Huntington and New Earswick ward
The parishes of Huntington and New Earswick

 * Represented the Huntington and New Earswick ward of City of York Council, 20032007 
 † Represented the Huntington and New Earswick ward of City of York Council, 19992007

Micklegate ward

 * Represented the Bishophill ward of York City Council, 19821996,  the Bishophill ward of City of York Council, 19952003,   and the Micklegate ward of City of York Council, 20032007 
 † Represented the Micklegate ward of City of York Council, 20032007

Osbaldwick ward
The parishes of Murton and Osbaldwick

 * Represented the Osbaldwick / Heworth division of North Yorkshire County Council, 19851996,  and the Osbaldwick ward of City of York Council, 19992007

Rural West York ward
The parishes of Askham Bryan, Askham Richard, Copmanthorpe, Hessay, Nether Poppleton, Rufforth with Knapton, and Upper Poppleton

 * Represented the Rural West York ward of City of York Council, 20032007 
 † Represented the Upper Poppleton ward of City of York Council, 19952003,   and the Rural West York ward of City of York Council, 20032007

Skelton, Rawcliffe, and Clifton Without ward
The parishes of Clifton Without, Rawcliffe, and Skelton

 * Represented the Rawcliffe division of North Yorkshire County Council, 19891996,  the Rawcliffe and Skelton ward of City of York Council, 19952003,   and the Skelton, Rawcliffe, and Clifton Without ward of City of York Council, 20032007 
 † Represented the Skelton, Rawcliffe, and Clifton Without ward of City of York Council, 20032007

Strensall ward
The parishes of Earswick, Stockton-on-the-Forest, and Strensall with Towthorpe

 * Represented the Skelton ward of Ryedale District Council, 19911996,  and the Strensall ward of City of York Council, 19962007  
 † Represented the Strensall ward of City of York Council, 20032007

Westfield ward

 * Represented the Westfield ward of York City Council, 19731979, the Foxwood ward of York City Council, 19791996,  the Westfield division of North Yorkshire County Council, 19731985, the Foxwood division of North Yorkshire County Council, 19851996,  and the Foxwood ward of City of York Council, 19952007   
 † Represented the Westfield ward of York City Council, 19791996,  the Westfield division of North Yorkshire County Council, 19931996,  and the Westfield ward of City of York Council, 19952007   
 ‡ Represented the Westfield ward of York City Council, 19941996,  and the Westfield ward of City of York Council, 19992007  
 § Represented the Holgate ward of York City Council, 19921996,  and the Holgate ward of City of York Council, 19952003  
 ¶ Represented the Micklegate ward of York City Council, 19911996

Wheldrake ward
The parishes of Deighton, Elvington, Naburn, and Wheldrake

 * Represented the Wheldrake ward of City of York Council, 20032007

References

2007 English local elections
2007
2000s in York